Essex Heritage is a non-profit organization charted to promote the cultural heritage of Essex County in the Commonwealth of Massachusetts. Working with both public and private partnerships and with the National Park Service, the group supports and develops programs that enhance, preserve and encourage regional awareness of the area’s unique historic, cultural and natural resources. Headquartered in Salem, Massachusetts, the Commission services the 34 communities of Essex County. It has been recognized by the United States Congress in recognition of the important role that this region played in American history and the significant heritage sites that are still in the area. The organization's website is: www.essexheritage.org. See Essex National Heritage Commission.

Events 

The organization has sponsored a number of events and programs that celebrate the region’s history, character and cultural heritage. These include:

Essex Heritage Partnership Grant Program
Border to Boston – an Eight Community Recreational Path
*Bakers Island Light Station
A Park for Every Classroom
Trails & Sails: 10 Days of Exploring Heritage in Essex County
Essex Heritage Membership Program
Visitor Centers
Heritage Landscape Inventory
Essex Coastal Scenic Byway

External links 
Essex Heritage Website 

History organizations based in the United States